is a passenger railway station located in the city of Takasago, Hyōgo Prefecture, Japan, operated by the private Sanyo Electric Railway.

Lines
Arai Station is served by the Sanyo Electric Railway Main Line.

Station layout
The station consists of two ground-level unnumbered side platforms serving two tracks. The station building is located on the north side of the station, and the platforms are connected by a footbridge. The station is unattended.

Platforms

Adjacent stations

History
The station opened on 19 August 1923.

Accidents
On 12 February 2013, at around 15:50, a non-stop 6-car limited express service bound for  collided with the rear end of a truck which had not completely cleared the level crossing to the west of the station. The first two cars of the train derailed and slid 170 m before hitting the edge of the station platform and coming to rest. 15 people were injured in the collision, including the train driver and truck driver.

Passenger statistics
In fiscal 2018, the station was used by an average of 6597 passengers daily (boarding passengers only).

Surrounding area
 Kobe Steel Takasago factory
 Mitsubishi Heavy Industries Takasago factory
 Kikkoman Takasago factory
 
 
  
 Takasago Minami Senior High School
 Arai Elementary School

See also
List of railway stations in Japan

References

External links

 Arai Station information (Sanyo Electric Railway) 

Railway stations in Japan opened in 1923
Railway stations in Hyōgo Prefecture
Takasago, Hyōgo